The Palawan blue flycatcher (Cyornis lemprieri) is a species of bird in the family Muscicapidae.
It is endemic to the Philippines.

Its natural habitat is subtropical or tropical moist lowland forests.
It is threatened by habitat loss.

References

Palawan blue flycatcher
Birds of Palawan
Birds described in 1884
Taxonomy articles created by Polbot